IREA may refer to:

Companies and organizations 

 Intermountain Rural Electric Association (now CORE Electric Cooperative), a non-profit electric utility company in the U.S. state of Colorado
 International Renewable Energy Alliance, a partnership of international renewable energy organizations
 Iranian Esperanto Association, the national association of the World Esperanto Association in Iran

Law

 Internet Radio Equality Act, a legislative piece in the United States abandoned in 2008